Major James Matthew Stronge (21 June 1932 – 21 January 1981) was a soldier and Ulster Unionist Party MP in the Parliament of Northern Ireland, and the later Northern Ireland Assembly. He was the son and heir of Sir Norman Stronge, Bt; they were both killed by the Provisional Irish Republican Army at his family home, Tynan Abbey.

Life and career 
Born into an aristocratic family, he was educated at Eton College and Christ Church, Oxford. In 1967, he was appointed High Sheriff of Armagh.

He served as Ulster Unionist Member of Parliament (MP) for Mid Armagh for three years until the prorogation of Stormont in 1972 and a member of the Northern Ireland Assembly, 1973-1974.

Stronge was also an officer in the Grenadier Guards. Having withdrawn from political and military life, his main interests since were confined to merchant banking and service as a RUC Reserve Constable.

Death 
Stronge was killed alongside his elderly father Norman, by the Provisional Irish Republican Army in the library of his home, Tynan Abbey, on the evening of 21 January 1981.

The Stronge family's home was then burnt to the ground. The bodies of father and son were later recovered from their blazing home. On seeing the explosions at the house (and a flare Norman had lit in an attempt to alert the authorities), Royal Ulster Constabulary (RUC ) personnel arrived at the scene and established a road block at the gate lodge. They encountered at least eight fleeing gunmen in two vehicles that rammed the checkpoint. The gunmen got off the cars and scattered. There followed a gunfight lasting 20 minutes in which at least 200 shots were fired before the attackers faded away. There were no casualties among the security forces.

Author Tim Pat Coogan stated that Norman Stronge and his son were shot because sectarian assassinations were claiming the lives of Catholics, but did not state that they were involved in these killings.

As Stronge was shot alongside his father, and it is not known who was shot first, he is presumed to have momentarily succeeded as 9th Baronet under the legal fiction known as the doctrine of survival.

Son and father were buried in Tynan Parish church, at his funeral, a telegram sent from the Queen (to one of Norman's daughters) was read, it stated; "I was deeply shocked to learn of the tragic death of your father and brother; Prince Philip joins me in sending you and your sister all our deepest sympathy on your dreadful loss. Sir Norman's loyal and distinguished service will be remembered".

In 1984, Seamus Shannon was arrested by the Garda Síochána in the Republic of Ireland and handed over to the RUC on a warrant accusing him of involvement in the killing of James and his father. The Irish Supreme Court considering his extradition to Northern Ireland rejected the defence that these were political offences saying that they were "so brutal, cowardly and callous that it would be a distortion of language if they were to be accorded the status of a political offence". The charges were later dropped against Shannon.

Memorial
James Stronge is remembered with a tablet in the assembly chamber in the Parliament Buildings at Stormont.
He is also listed on the National Police Memorial Roll Of Honour.

See also
The Troubles in Tynan
Provisional IRA East Tyrone Brigade

References

1932 births
1981 deaths
Alumni of Christ Church, Oxford
Assassinated politicians from Northern Ireland
Baronets in the Baronetage of the United Kingdom
Deaths by firearm in Northern Ireland
Grenadier Guards officers
High Sheriffs of Armagh
Male murder victims
Members of the House of Commons of Northern Ireland 1969–1973
Members of the Northern Ireland Assembly 1973–1974
British police officers
People educated at Eton College
People killed by the Provisional Irish Republican Army
People murdered in Northern Ireland
Royal Ulster Constabulary officers
Ulster Unionist Party members of the House of Commons of Northern Ireland
Assassinated police officers
Members of the House of Commons of Northern Ireland for County Armagh constituencies
1981 murders in the United Kingdom